Forgery is the process of making false documents.

Forgery may also refer to the following conceptually similar topics:

Art forgery
Digital signature forgery

See also

Counterfeit